Spirits of the Ghan is 2015 Australian novel by writer Judy Nunn. It is Nunn's thirteenth novel. The book was inspired by a journey that Nunn took on the Ghan.

Overview
The novel follows the final stages of the completion of the Ghan railway line across central Australia. It focuses on the characters of Jessica Manning, a negotiator who engages with the local Aboriginal inhabitants, and Matthew Witherton, the leader of a survey team tasked with ensuring the railway line is completed.

References

External links
Spirits of the Ghan at Penguin Books

2015 Australian novels
Novels set in the Northern Territory

Australian novels
Random House books